Berberis, commonly known as barberry, is a large genus of deciduous and evergreen shrubs from  tall, found throughout temperate and subtropical regions of the world (apart from Australia). Species diversity is greatest in South America and Asia; Europe, Africa and North America have native species as well. The best-known Berberis species is the European barberry, Berberis vulgaris, which is common in Europe, North Africa, the Middle East, and central Asia, and has been widely introduced in North America. Many of the species have spines on the shoots and all along the margins of the leaves.

Description
The bud in the axil of each thorn-leaf then develops a short shoot with several normal, photosynthetic leaves. Only on young seedlings do leaves develop on the long shoots, with the adult foliage style developing after the young plant is 1–2 years old.

Many deciduous species, such as Berberis thunbergii and B. vulgaris, are noted for their attractive pink or red autumn color. In some evergreen species from China, such as B. candidula and B. verruculosa, the undersides of the leaves are brilliant white, a feature valued horticulturally.  Some horticultural variants of B. thunbergii have dark red to violet foliage.

The flowers are produced singly or in racemes of up to 20 on a single flower-head.

Some authors regard the compound-leaved species as belonging to a different genus, Mahonia. There are no consistent differences between the two groups other than the leaf pinnation (Berberis sensu stricto appear to have simple leaves, but these are in reality compound with a single leaflet; they are termed "unifoliolate"), and many botanists prefer to classify all these plants in the single genus Berberis. However, a recent DNA-based phylogenetic study retains the two separate genera, by clarifying that unifoliolate-leaved Berberis s.s. is derived from within a paraphyletic group of shrubs bearing imparipinnate evergreen leaves, which the paper then divides into three genera: Mahonia, Alloberberis (formerly Mahonia section Horridae), and Moranothamnus (formerly Berberis claireae); it confirms that a broadly-circumscribed Berberis (that is, including Mahonia, Alloberberis, and Moranothamnus) is monophyletic.

Ecology
Berberis species are used as food plants by the larvae of some Lepidoptera species, including the moths barberry carpet moth (Pareulype berberata), and mottled pug (Eupithecia exiguata).

Berberis species can infect wheat with stem rust, a serious fungal disease of wheat and related grains. Berberis vulgaris (European barberry) and Berberis canadensis (American barberry) serve as alternate host species of the rust fungus responsible, the fungus (Puccinia graminis). For this reason, cultivation of B. vulgaris is prohibited in many areas, and imports to the United States are forbidden.  The North American B. canadensis, native to Appalachia and the Midwest United States, was nearly eradicated for this reason, and is now rarely seen extant, with the most remaining occurrences in the Virginia mountains.

Some Berberis species have become invasive when planted outside of their native ranges, including B. glaucocarpa and B. darwinii in New Zealand (where it is now banned from sale and propagation), and B. vulgaris and green-leaved B. thunbergii in much of the eastern United States.

Japanese barberry is considered an invasive plant in 32 US states. It is deer-resistant because of its taste and is favored as a shelter for ticks capable of transmitting lyme disease.

Cultivation

Several species of Berberis are popular garden shrubs, grown for such features as ornamental leaves, yellow flowers, or red or blue-black berries. Numerous cultivars and hybrids have been selected for garden use. Low-growing Berberis plants are also commonly planted as pedestrian barriers. Taller-growing species are valued for crime prevention; being dense and viciously spiny, they are effective barriers to burglars. Thus they are often planted below vulnerable windows, and used as hedges. Many species are resistant to predation by deer.

Species in cultivation include:
B. darwinii
B. dictyophylla
B. julianae
B. thunbergii
B. verruculosa

The following hybrid selections have gained the Royal Horticultural Society's Award of Garden Merit:
B. 'Georgei'
B. × lologensis 'Apricot Queen' 
B. × media 'Red Jewel'

B. × stenophylla 'Corallina Compacta' 
B. × stenophylla (golden barberry)

Culinary uses

Berberis vulgaris grows in the wild in much of Europe and West Asia. It produces large crops of edible berries, rich in vitamin C, but with a sharp acid flavour. In Europe for many centuries the berries were used for culinary purposes much as citrus peel is used. Today in Europe they are very infrequently used. The country in which they are used the most is Iran, where they are referred to as zereshk in Persian. The berries are common in Persian cuisine such as in pilaf (zereshk polo) and as a flavouring for poultry. Because of their sour flavor, they are sometimes cooked with sugar before being added to Persian rice. Iranian markets sell dried zereshk. In Russia and Eastern Europe, it is sometimes used in jams as a source of pectin (especially with mixed berries). An extract of barberries is a common flavoring for soft drinks, candies, and sweets.

Berberis microphylla and B. darwinii (both known as calafate and michay) are two species found in Patagonia in Argentina and Chile. Their edible purple fruits are used for jams and infusions.

Traditional medicine
The dried fruit of Berberis vulgaris is used in herbal medicine. The chemical constituents include isoquinolone alkaloids, especially berberine. A full list of phytochemicals was compiled and published in 2014. The safety of using berberine for any condition is not adequately defined by high-quality clinical research. Its potential for causing adverse effects is high, including untoward interactions with prescription drugs, reducing the intended effect of established therapies. It is particularly unsafe for use in children.

Other uses
Historically, yellow dye was extracted from the stem, root, and bark.

The thorns of the barberry shrub have been used to clean ancient gold coins, as they are soft enough that they will not damage the surface but will remove corrosion and debris.

The acidic young leaves are sometimes chewed for refreshment by parched hikers.

Gallery

References

 
 
 
Royal New Zealand Institute of horticulture.  Berberis glaucocarpa

External links

 
Berberidaceae genera
Berries
CYP3A4 inhibitors
Medicinal plants
Plants used in bonsai
Taxa named by Carl Linnaeus